"So Sophisticated" is a song by American rapper Rick Ross. It was released on June 5, 2012 as the second single from his fifth studio album God Forgives, I Don't (2012). The song, produced by The Beat Bully, features a guest appearance from fellow Maybach Music Group rapper Meek Mill.  On September 23, 2014, the single was certified Gold by the RIAA.

Background
The song was premiered by Funkmaster Flex on May 21, 2012.

Music video
The music video was directed by Dre Films and premiered on MTV Jams on June 24, 2012.

Live performances
On July 26, 2012, Rick Ross performed the song on Jimmy Kimmel Live!.

Track listing
 Digital single

Charts

Release history

References

2012 singles
2012 songs
Rick Ross songs
Meek Mill songs
Maybach Music Group singles
Songs written by Rick Ross
Songs written by Meek Mill